Petare is a Caracas Metro station on Line 1. It was opened on 10 November 1989 as part of the extension of Line 1 from Los Dos Caminos to Palo Verde. The station is between La California and Palo Verde.

The station is located in the city of Petare.

References

Caracas Metro stations
1989 establishments in Venezuela
Railway stations opened in 1989